Phenacodus (Greek: "deception" (phenax), "tooth' (odus)) is an extinct genus of mammals from the late Paleocene through middle Eocene, about 55 million years ago. It is one of the earliest and most primitive of the ungulates, typifying the family Phenacodontidae and the order Perissodactyla.

Description
The middle toe was the largest, and the weight of the body was mainly supported on this and the two adjoining digits, which appear to have been encased in hooves, foreshadowing the tridactyl type common in perissodactyls and certain extinct groups of ungulates. The skull was small, with proportionately minute brain; and the arched back, strong lumbar vertebrae, long and powerful tail, and comparatively feeble fore-quarters all proclaim kinship with the primitive carnivores Creodonta. All the bones of the limbs are separate, and those of the carpus and tarsus do not alternate - each one in the upper row is placed immediately above the corresponding one in the row below. The full series of forty-four teeth was developed; and the upper molars were short-crowned, or brachyodont, with six low cusps, two internal, two intermediate and two external, so that they were of the typical primitive bunodont structure.

In habits, the animal was cursorial and herbivorous, or possibly carnivorous. In the early Paleocene of North America, the place of the above species was taken by Tetraclaenodon puercensis, an animal only half the size of P. primaevus, with the terminal joints of the limbs intermediate between hoofs and claws, and the first and fifth toes taking their full share in the support of the weight of the body. These two genera may be regarded as forming the earliest stages in the evolution of the horse, coming below Hyracotherium (see Equidae). As ancestors of the artiodactyl section of the Ungulata, we may look to forms more or less closely related to the North American Lower Eocene genus Mioclaenus, typifying the family Mioclaenidae. The species of Mioclaenus were five-toed, bunodont Condylarthra, with a decided approximation to the perissodactyl type in the structure of the feet. A second type of Condylarthra from the North American Lower Eocene is represented by the family Meniscotheriidae, including the genus Meniscotherium.

A 2014 cladistic analysis places both Phenacodus and Meniscotherium within stem perissodactyls.

Teeth and jaws probably referable to the Condylarthra have been obtained in European early Tertiary formations. All Ungulata probably originated from Condylarthra.

Phylogeny
Cladogram after Gelfo and Sigé, 2011:

Gallery

References

Condylarths
Paleocene mammals
Eocene mammals
Paleogene mammals of North America
Fossil taxa described in 1873
Prehistoric placental genera